Hope Rogers (born January 7, 1993) is an American rugby union player who plays for Exeter Chiefs in the Allianz Premier 15s. 

She debuted for the  against France in June 2013. She was selected for the squad to the 2017 Women's Rugby World Cup in Ireland. She made her rugby sevens debut at the 2017 Sydney Women's Sevens.

Early career 
Rogers began playing rugby as a sophomore in 2009 at Chambersburg Area Senior High School. In her first year of rugby she made the Mid-Atlantic All Star-Team that went to the U19 National All-Star Championship tournament. She led them to a championship title the next year as captain. In 2011 she received the Kevin Higgins College Scholarships.

She signed for Exeter Chiefs in January 2022. She started the 2021-22 Premier 15s final, finishing as runners up to Saracens Women. Rodgers was named in the 2021-22 Premier 15s team of the year.

International career 
Rogers was named in the Eagles squad for the 2022 Pacific Four Series in New Zealand. She was also named in the United States squad for the 2021 Rugby World Cup.

References

External links
 Hope Rogers at USA Rugby
 
 

1993 births
Living people
American female rugby union players
United States women's international rugby union players
Pennsylvania State University alumni
21st-century American women